Pietro Gori (August 1, 1865–January 8, 1911) was an Italian lawyer, journalist, intellectual and anarchist poet. He is known for his political activities, and as author of some of the most famous anarchist songs of the late 19th century, including Addio a Lugano ("Farewell to Lugano"), Stornelli d'esilio ("Exile Songs"), Ballata per Sante Caserio ("Ballad for Sante Caserio"), Inno del Primo Maggio ("May, 1 Anthem"). In 1898 he immigrated to Argentina where he contributed to the development of the anarchists' influence in the labor movement, specifically in the Argentine Regional Workers' Federation.

Further reading 

 Maurizio Binaghi: Addio, Lugano bella. Gli esuli politici nella Svizzera italiana di fine Ottocento. Dadò editore. Locarno, 2002.
 
 
 
 Maurizio Antonioli: Pietro Gori il cavaliere errante dell'anarchia. Studi e testi, Seconda edizione riveduta e ampliata. Biblioteca di storia dell'anarchismo 5. Biblioteca Franco Serantini. Pisa 1996.

External links

 Celebrations for the centenary of the death

1865 births
1911 deaths
Italian anarchists
Italian essayists
Journalists from Sicily
Italian male journalists
Italian poets
Italian male poets
19th-century Italian lawyers
Italian criminologists
Italian socialists
Writers from Messina
Male essayists